Eric Rogers (born Eric Gaukroger; 25 September 1921 – 8 April 1981) was an English-born composer, conductor and arranger, best known for composing the scores for twenty-two Carry On films.

Early life
Rogers moved with his parents from Halifax, England, to Morriston, Wales, when he was three. Rogers was interested in music from an early age, and during his attendance at church as a child, he was taught to play the church organ. His musical apprenticeship was generally untutored and he found himself playing the piano during the Second World War for free beer.

Career
After the Second World War, he set up his own orchestra, playing in the Orchid Room at London's Trocadero. He orchestrated the original stage production of Oliver!, first performed at the New Theatre, London on 30 June 1960.

As his reputation grew, he was offered many conducting jobs for films. Most notably, he composed the music for 22 Carry On films. He also conducted the music for the first James Bond film Dr. No under the name Eric Rogers.  He would later go on to compose many film scores himself, most notably Carry On Cabby in 1963, Carry On Matron in 1972 and a hoard of other Carry On films. His final Carry On score was for Carry On Emmannuelle in 1978.

Rogers emigrated to America in 1975, after working intermittently in the UK and America from 1970, and became in demand for composing various film and TV series. By this point he had struck up an alliance with DePatie and Freleng productions, who were at the time making a number of  animated series for children, such as Return to the Planet of the Apes and What's New Mr. Magoo?. He worked for the company for four years, conducting scores for What's New Mr. Magoo? and Pink Panther in a Pink Christmas, and providing scores for Return to the Planet of the Apes and Spider-Woman (TV series), for which he composed and conducted the theme and all the incidental music. He also conducted Dean Elliott's score for The New Fantastic Four animated series in 1978. In 1981, he conducted the music for Dennis the Menace in Mayday for Mother.

Personal life
Rogers was married to a Bluebell girl, Enid Merrigan, from Swansea, with whom he had two sons. On the day of the wedding, the bride's father was indisposed, and the bride was given away by Max Bygraves.

Eric's brother, Alan Rogers, was also a musician and songwriter and has a lyric credit on the 1965 film, Carry on Cowboy.

Death
He died on 8 April 1981 in Chalfont St. Peter, Buckinghamshire, aged 59. His death was registered under the name Eric Gauk-Roger.

Film and TV music

Film 

Meet Mr. Lucifer (1953)
The Iron Maiden (1962)
 Nurse on Wheels (1963)
 Carry On Cabby (1963)
Carry On Jack (1963)
This Is My Street (1964)
Carry On Spying (1964)
Carry On Cleo (1964)
The Big Job (1965)
Three Hats for Lisa (1965)
Carry On Cowboy (1965)
 Carry On Screaming! (1966)
Don't Lose Your Head (1966)
Follow That Camel (1967)
Carry On Doctor (1967)
Carry On... Up the Khyber (1968)
 Carry On Camping (1969)
Carry On Again Doctor (1969)
Doctor in Trouble (1970)
Carry On Up the Jungle (1970)
Carry On Loving (1970)
Carry On Henry (1971)
Carry on at Your Convenience (1971)
Revenge (1971)
Assault (1971)
Quest for Love (1971)
Carry On Matron (1972)
Carry On Abroad (1972)
Bless This House (1972)
 All Coppers Are... (1972)
 No Sex Please, We're British (1973)
Carry On Girls (1973)
Carry On Dick (1974)
Carry On Behind (1975)
 Carry On Emmannuelle (1978)

Television 
 Sunday Night at the London Palladium (1950s)
 Carry On Laughing (1975)
 The Chiffy Kids (1976)

References

External links
 
 Eric Rogers on What A Carry On

1921 births
1981 deaths
English film score composers
English male film score composers
20th-century classical musicians
20th-century English composers
20th-century British male musicians
20th-century British musicians